Gerald Anderson (born 1989) is a Filipino American actor based in the Philippines.

Gerald Anderson may also refer to:

Gerald K. Anderson (1921–1995), Wisconsin legislator
Gerald Frank Anderson (1898–1984), South African born flying ace
Gerald Anderson (cyclist), British cyclist
Gerald Hamilton Anderson (1922–2003), Canadian politician

See also
Gerry Anderson (disambiguation)
Jerry Anderson (disambiguation)
Gerard Anderson (1889–1914), British hurdler